Moorestown-Lenola is an unincorporated community and census-designated place (CDP) located within Moorestown Township in Burlington County, New Jersey, United States. As of the 2010 United States Census, the CDP's population was 14,217.

Geography
According to the United States Census Bureau, the CDP had a total area of 7.118 square miles (18.435 km2), including 7.010 square miles (18.157 km2) of land and 0.108 square miles (0.279 km2) of water (1.51%).

Demographics

Census 2010

Census 2000
As of the 2000 United States Census there were 13,860 people, 5,250 households, and 3,827 families living in the CDP. The population density was 760.1/km2 (1,967.6/mi2). There were 5,440 housing units at an average density of 298.4/km2 (772.3/mi2). The racial makeup of the CDP was 88.68% White, 6.96% African American, 0.19% Native American, 2.13% Asian, 0.01% Pacific Islander, 0.55% from other races, and 1.49% from two or more races. Hispanic or Latino of any race were 1.98% of the population.

There were 5,250 households, out of which 34.7% had children under the age of 18 living with them, 59.5% were married couples living together, 10.9% had a female householder with no husband present, and 27.1% were non-families. 23.2% of all households were made up of individuals, and 10.9% had someone living alone who was 65 years of age or older. The average household size was 2.59 and the average family size was 3.07.

In the CDP the population was spread out, with 26.4% under the age of 18, 4.7% from 18 to 24, 25.6% from 25 to 44, 25.7% from 45 to 64, and 17.6% who were 65 years of age or older. The median age was 41 years. For every 100 females, there were 87.8 males. For every 100 females age 18 and over, there were 83.8 males.

The median income for a household in the CDP was $68,770, and the median income for a family was $79,953. Males had a median income of $60,486 versus $34,847 for females. The per capita income for the CDP was $34,311. About 3.0% of families and 4.3% of the population were below the poverty line, including 4.4% of those under age 18 and 3.6% of those age 65 or over.

References

Census-designated places in Burlington County, New Jersey
Moorestown, New Jersey